The red-eyed vireo (Vireo olivaceus) is a small American songbird. It is somewhat warbler-like but not closely related to the New World warblers (Parulidae). Common across its vast range, this species is not considered threatened by the IUCN.

"Vireo" is a Latin word referring to a green migratory bird, perhaps the female golden oriole, possibly the European greenfinch. The specific olivaceus is New Latin for olive-green, from Latin oliva "olive".

Description and systematics
Adults are mainly olive-green on the upper parts with white underparts; they have a red iris and a grey crown edged with black. There is a dark blackish line through the eyes and a wide white stripe just above that line. They have thick blue-grey legs and a stout bill. They are yellowish on the flanks and undertail coverts (though this is faint in some populations).

In the past, the yellow-green vireo (V. flavoviridis), the chivi vireo (V. chivi), and the Noronha vireo (V. gracilirostris) have been considered to be conspecific with the red-eyed vireo; the chivi vireo was split most recently. Other closely related species include the black-whiskered vireo (V. altiloquus) and the Yucatan vireo (V. magister).

Measurements:

Both sexes:

 Length: 4.7-5.1 in (12–13 cm)
 Weight: 0.4-0.9 oz (12-26 g)
 Wingspan: 9.1-9.8 in (23–25 cm)

Song

Red-eyed vireos are one of the most prolific singers in the bird world. They usually sing high up in trees for long periods of time in a question-and-answer rhythm. This species holds the record for most songs given in a single day among bird species, with more than 20,000 songs in one day.

Songs generally consist of 1-5 syllables between 2 and 6 kHz. Songs are usually spaced apart by 0.8–1 seconds although at times vireos may sing at a slower or faster rate. Red-eyed vireos have a large repertoire size with one study finding an average of 31.4 song types per bird with one individual singing 73 different song types.

Ecology

The breeding habitat of the red-eyed vireo is in the open wooded areas across Canada and the eastern and northwestern United States. These birds migrate to South America, where they spend the winter. The Latin American population occur in virtually any wooded habitat in their range. Most of these are residents, but the populations breeding in the far southern part of this species' range (e.g. most of its range in Argentina, Uruguay, Paraguay and Bolivia) migrate north as far as Central America.

In northern Ohio, it seems to return to breed at about the same time as one century ago; but it may leave for winter quarters one or two weeks earlier at present than it did in the past.

Red-eyed vireos glean insects from tree foliage, favouring caterpillars and aphids and sometimes hovering while foraging. In some tropical regions, they are commonly seen to attend mixed-species feeding flocks, moving through the forest higher up in the trees than the bulk of such flocks.

They also eat berries, especially before migration, and in the winter quarters, where trees bearing popular fruit like tamanqueiro (Alchornea glandulosa) or gumbo-limbo (Bursera simaruba) will even attract them to parks and gardens. Fruit are typically not picked up from a hover, but the birds often quite acrobatically reach for them, even hanging upside down.

The nest is a cup in a fork of a tree branch. The red-eyed vireo suffers from nest parasitism by the brown-headed cowbird (Molothrus ater) in the north of its range, and by the shiny cowbird (M. bonariensis) further south. Parasitism by Haemoproteus and trypanosoma might affect these birds not infrequently, as was noted in studies of birds caught in Parque Nacional de La Macarena and near Turbo (Colombia): though only three red-eyed vireos were examined, all were infected with at least one of these parasites.

Vagrancy
The red-eyed vireo is a visitor to some western states, especially California. This vireo is one of the more frequent American passerine vagrants to Europe, with more than one hundred records, mainly in Ireland and Great Britain.

Footnotes

References
 Basto, Natalia; Rodríguez, Oscar A.; Marinkelle, Cornelis J.; Gutierrez, Rafael & Matta, Nubia Estela (2006). "Haematozoa in birds from la Macarena National Natural Park (Colombia)". Caldasia 28(2): 371-377 [English with Spanish abstract]. 
 Foster, Mercedes S. (2007). The potential of fruiting trees to enhance converted habitats for migrating birds in southern Mexico. Bird Conservation International 17(1): 45–61. 
 Henninger, W.F. (1906).  "A preliminary list of the birds of Seneca County, Ohio." Wilson Bull. 18(2): 47–60. DjVu fulltext
 Londono, Aurora; Pulgarin-R., Paulo C. & Blair, Silva (2007). "Blood Parasites in Birds From the Lowlands of Northern Colombia." Caribb. J. Sci. 43(1): 87–93.
 Machado, C.G. (1999). "A composição dos bandos mistos de aves na Mata Atlântica da Serra de Paranapiacaba, no sudeste brasileiro [Mixed flocks of birds in Atlantic Rain Forest in Serra de Paranapiacaba, southeastern Brazil]." Revista Brasileira de Biologia 59(1): 75-85 [Portuguese with English abstract].  
 Ohio Ornithological Society (OOS) (2004). "Annotated Ohio state checklist. Version of April 2004"
 Pascotto, Márcia Cristina (2006). Avifauna dispersora de sementes de Alchornea glandulosa (Euphorbiaceae) em uma área de mata ciliar no estado de São Paulo [Seed dispersal of Alchornea glandulosa (Euphorbiaceae) by birds in a gallery forest in São Paulo, southeastern Brazil]." Revista Brasileira de Ornitologia 14(3): 291-296 [Portuguese with English abstract].

External links

Red-eyed Vireo - Vireo olivaceus - USGS Patuxent Bird Identification InfoCenter
Red-eyed Vireo Species Account - Cornell Lab of Ornithology
Stamps (for Saint Vincent and the Grenadines, Venezuela) with RangeMap at bird-stamps.org
 
 
 
 Red-eyed Vireo Bird Sound at Florida Museum of Natural History
 

red-eyed vireo
Birds of Canada
Birds of the United States
Birds of South America
Birds of Venezuela
Birds of Saint Vincent and the Grenadines
Birds of the Guianas
Birds of the Amazon Basin
Birds of the Cerrado
Birds of Ecuador
Birds of the Pantanal
red-eyed vireo
Birds of Brazil
Taxa named by Carl Linnaeus